Gemmula bearrizensis is an extinct species of sea snail, a marine gastropod mollusk in the family Turridae, the turrids.

Description

Distribution
Fossils of this marine species have been found in Paleogene strata near Biarritz, France.

References

 Boussac J. (1911). Études stratigraphiques et paléontologiques sur le Nummulitique de Biarritz. Annales Hébert. 5: 1-96, pls 1-24.
 Pacaud J.M. (2021). Remarques taxonomiques et nomenclaturales sur les mollusques gastéropodes du Paléogène de France et description d'espèces nouvelles. Partie 3. Conoidea. Xenophora Taxonomy. 31: 41–48.

bearrizensis
Gastropods described in 2021
Fossil taxa described in 2021